The 125th General Assembly comprised the state legislature of the U.S. state of Ohio. The senate is the upper house of the Ohio General Assembly. Every two years, half of the senate seats come up for election. The 125th General Assembly was in session in 2003 and 2004. The party distribution was 22 Republicans and 11 Democrats.

Leadership

Majority Leadership

Minority Leadership

Members of the Ohio Senate, 125th General Assembly

125
Senate 125
2003 in Ohio
2004 in Ohio
Lists of Ohio politicians
Lists of state senators of the United States